Stalybridge  officially sometimes written in early years as Staleybridge was a constituency represented in the House of Commons of the UK Parliament from 1868 until 1918 by one MP. It comprised the borough of Stalybridge which lay in Lancashire and Cheshire and which is in the east of today's Greater Manchester.  On abolition for the 1918 general election under the Representation of the People Act 1918 the seat's main replacement became Stalybridge and Hyde.

Creation, boundaries and abolition

Parliament created this seat under the Reform Act 1867, the part of the second Reform Act that covered England and Wales, which defined its components as the:
Municipal Borough of Stalybridge
The remaining portion of the township of Dukinfield
Township of Stalley
The District of the Local Board of Health of Mossley

It was marginally expanded in line with a local government change under the Redistribution of Seats Act 1885, to be:

The seat was abolished by the Representation of the People Act 1918, with the majority of its electorate being included in the new constituency of Stalybridge and Hyde. A small area which was now part of the municipal borough of Mossley in Lancashire was added to the new constituency of Mossley.

Members of Parliament 
1868 Constituency created
Previously part of North Cheshire and South Lancashire

Elections

Elections in the 1860s

Elections in the 1870s
Sidebottom's death caused a by-election.

Elections in the 1880s

Elections in the 1890s

Elections in the 1900s

Elections in the 1910s

General Election 1914–15:

Another General Election was required to take place before the end of 1915. The political parties had been making preparations for an election to take place and by the July 1914, the following candidates had been selected; 
Unionist: John Wood
Liberal: Walter Kenyon

See also

 History of parliamentary constituencies and boundaries in Cheshire

Sources

 

Parliamentary constituencies in North West England (historic)
Constituencies of the Parliament of the United Kingdom established in 1868
Constituencies of the Parliament of the United Kingdom disestablished in 1918
Stalybridge